1837 in archaeology.

Events
 Antikensammlung Berlin acquires the 5th century BC red-figure pottery Berlin Foundry Cup from Volci.

Explorations
 Richard William Howard Vyse investigates the interiors of the Pyramids of Giza using blasting techniques.

Excavations
 Rillaton Barrow in Cornwall, England, excavated and Rillaton Gold Cup found.

Finds
 Pietroasele Treasure found in Romania.

Publications
 John Gardner Wilkinson - Manners and Customs of the Ancient Egyptians.

Births
 Theodore M. Davis, American Egyptological excavation sponsor (d. 1915).

Deaths

Archaeology
Archaeology by year
Archaeology
Archaeology